Darul Ifta may refer to:

 Bangsamoro Darul Ifta', an Islamic advisory council in Bangsamoro, Philippines
 Dar al-Ifta al-Misriyyah, an Egyptian Islamic advisory, justiciary and governmental body
 Darul Ifta at Darul Uloom Deoband, in Uttar Pradesh, India
 Darul Ifta Leicester, led by Muhammad ibn Adam al-Kawthari, in Leicester, UK

See also
 Darulfatwa - Islamic High Council of Australia
 Mufti
 Fatwa
 Jamiat Ul Mominat, an Islamic female seminary in Hyderabad, India